Deilephila askoldensis is a moth of the family Sphingidae.

Distribution 
It is found in southeastern Russia, northeastern China, the Korean Peninsula, and northern Japan.

Description 
D. askoldensis has a wingspan of 51–59 mm.

Biology 
Larvae feed on Vitis amurensis in Russia and Epilobium species in Japan.

References

Macroglossini
Moths described in 1879
Moths of Japan